Nakhl-e Ebrahimi (also Romanized as Nakhl-e Ebrāhīmī and Nakhl Ebrāhīmī; also known as Nakhl Ebrāhīm and Nakhl-e-Ebrāhīm) is a village in Tiab Rural District, in the Central District of Minab County, Hormozgan Province, Iran. At the 2006 census, its population was 1,883, in 378 families.

References 

Populated places in Minab County